Ranularia trilineata, common name : the Three-lined Triton, is a species of predatory sea snail, a marine gastropod mollusk in the family Cymatiidae.

Description
The length of the shell varies between 38 mm and 90 mm

Distribution
This species occurs in the Red Sea, the Indian Ocean and the Western Pacific Ocean.

References

 Vine, P. (1986). Red Sea Invertebrates. Immel Publishing, London. 224 pp

External links
 

Cymatiidae
Gastropods described in 1844